The 1993 World Junior Curling Championships were held from 21 to 27 March in Grindelwald, Switzerland.

Men

Teams

Round Robin

Tiebreakers 
For playoffs from 3rd and 4th places:

For 6th place:

Playoffs

Rankings

Women

Teams

Round Robin

Playoffs

Rankings

Awards
WJCC All-Star Team:

WJCC Sportsmanship Award:

Sources

J
1993 in Swiss sport
World Junior Curling Championships
Sports competitions in Grindelwald
International curling competitions hosted by Switzerland
March 1993 sports events in Europe
1993 in youth sport